Thorndyke is a 1964 crime television series which originally aired on BBC 1 in six episodes from 3 October to 7 November 1964, following on from a pilot broadcast on 6 July as part of the Detective anthology series. It is based on the novels and short stories by R. Austin Freeman featuring the detective Doctor Thorndyke, a pioneer in using forensic methods to solve cases.

All six episodes presumably still exist, but they have not been made available to the public.

Cast

Main
 Peter Copley as Doctor John Evelyn Thorndyke
 Paul Williamson as Doctor Jervis
 Patrick Newell as Polton
 Glyn Owen as Superintendent Morton

Other
Actors who appeared in individual episodes of the series include:
 George A. Cooper as Pratt
 Ronald Leigh-Hunt as John Simpson
 Jack May as Percival Bland
 Stephanie Bidmead as Kathy
 Kenneth Colley as Ellis 
 Jane Downs as Mrs. Crofton
 John Le Mesurier as  Pembury
 Anthony Sagar as  Ellis
 Royston Tickner as Smith
 Patrick Troughton as Frank Belfield
 Rex Rashley as Amos Caldwell
 Harry Towb as Ambrose
 Wanda Ventham as  Maud
 Peter Madden as Det. Supt. Martin
 Kevin Brennan Sergeant
 David Nettheim as Stalker
 Lennard Pearce as Shenston
 Donald Bisset as  Sergeant Hawkins
 Hilda Fenemore as  Mrs. Brattle
 Ivor Salter as Stanton
 Edwin Brown as Brattle
 Vernon Dobtcheff as  Coroner
 Aubrey Morris as Julius Wicks

References

Bibliography
 Adam, Alison. A History of Forensic Science: British beginnings in the twentieth century. Routledge, 2015.
 Perry, Christopher. The British Television Pilot Episodes Research Guide 1936-2015. 2015.
 Weissmann, Elke. Transnational Television Drama: Special Relations and Mutual Influence Between the US and UK. Palgrave Macmillan, 2012.

External links
 

BBC television dramas
1964 British television series debuts
1964 British television series endings
1960s British drama television series
1960s British television miniseries
English-language television shows
Television shows based on British novels
British detective television series